

First-team squad

Transfers

Esteghlal

In:

Out:

Matches

Final standings

AFC Champions League

Group stage

Round of 16

Goalscorers
Last updated Friday, May 14, 2010

Goalassistants

Last updated Friday, November 21, 2010

References

External links
Iran Premier League Statistics
Persian League

Esteghlal F.C. seasons
Esteghlal